This list of Canadian universities by endowment groups the universities in Canada according to their endowments.  As of the end of the 2021/2022 fiscal year, the total value of endowments at Canadian universities was nearly $21 billion.  Some universities do not have endowments while the largest endowment for a single university - the University of Toronto - is over $3 billion. 

Mount Allison University has the largest endowment per student of non-federated Canadian universities and the second largest endowment per student of all Canadian universities after Victoria University federated with the University of Toronto, reaching over $107k per student as of December 31, 2021. Mount Allison has significantly larger endowments than the average Canadian and Atlantic Canadian primarily undergraduate university.

Endowments over C$1 billion
The following are the Canadian universities with financial endowments over $1 billion, expressed in Canadian dollars at fair value. All sources are official audited financial statements published in the respective fiscal years. As a collegiate university, the University of Toronto reports its financial and endowment information exclusive of its colleges, which hold additional endowments of their own.

Endowments C$250 million to C$1 billion 
The following are the Canadian universities with the financial endowments between $250 million and $1 billion, expressed in Canadian dollars at fair value. All sources are official audited financial statements published in the respective fiscal years.

Endowments less than C$250 million
The following are the Canadian universities with financial endowments less than $250 million, expressed in Canadian dollars at fair value. All sources are official audited financial statements published in the respective fiscal years.

See also
Lists of institutions of higher education by endowment size
U15 Group of Canadian Research Universities
List of universities in Canada

References

Education finance in Canada
Endowment
Canada